Jason Michael Lee (born April 25, 1970) is an American actor, comedian, filmmaker, singer, photographer, and former professional skateboarder. He is known for playing Earl Hickey in the television comedy series My Name Is Earl, for which he was nominated for Best Actor in a Musical or Comedy TV series in 2005 and 2006 by The Golden Globes, and Dwight Hendricks in Memphis Beat (2010–2011).

He is also known for his roles in Kevin Smith films such as Mallrats, Chasing Amy, Dogma, Jay and Silent Bob Strike Back, Jersey Girl, Clerks II, and Cop Out. Lee won the Independent Spirit Award for Best Supporting Male for his performance in Chasing Amy. He also portrayed David Seville in the live-action/CGI Alvin and the Chipmunks film series. His other notable film roles include starring in Enemy of the State, Almost Famous, Vanilla Sky, Stealing Harvard, A Guy Thing and The Ballad of Jack and Rose. His voice acting credits include Syndrome in The Incredibles, Bones in Monster House and the title character in Underdog.

A former professional skateboarder, Lee is the co-founder and co-owner of Stereo Skateboards, founding the company in 1992 with fellow skateboarder Chris "Dune" Pastras. Since 1992, Stereo manufactures and distributes skateboard decks, equipment and apparel, as well as producing skate videos.

Early life
Lee was born in Santa Ana, California, on April 25, 1970. His father, Greg Lee, was a car dealership manager and his mother, Carol Lee, a homemaker. He has an older brother, James (b. 1968). Lee was raised in Huntington Beach and attended Ocean View High School. A hyperactive and energetic child, Lee took up skateboarding after his mother bought him a skateboard with the hope that he would use it to burn off excessive energy. Hooked on the art of skateboarding, Lee spent the majority of his time perfecting his craft, that would eventually lead to him dropping out of Ocean View High School so he could turn pro.

Career

Skateboarding
Lee was a professional skateboarder in the late 1980s and early 1990s. In 1992, he founded Stereo Sound Agency, known as Stereo Skateboards, with fellow skater Chris "Dune" Pastras. In 2003, after it had been defunct for a few years, the pair successfully revived the company. As of October 2013, Lee and Pastras remained on the professional "Classics" team roster.

Lee was featured in the skateboarding promotional video, Video Days, filmed for the skateboarding company Blind Skateboards. In 2004, Lee's skateboarding was featured in Way Out East!, a film produced by Stereo Skateboards.

In August 2012, Lee was also featured in a brief video on the skateboard website The Berrics entitled "Jason Lee decided to come to the park."

In August 2012, Lee participated in the ninth annual Stand-Up for Skateparks Event, which he chaired with Tony Hawk. The event is held annually by the Tony Hawk Charitable Foundation and seeks to "help create free, quality public skateparks for youth in low-income communities."

In October that same year, a video was released by the Keep A Breast Foundation, featuring various skateboarding identities, including Lee, together with Pastras. The video, contributing to the Foundation's aim to prevent and raise awareness of breast cancer, promotes the "I Love Boobies" bracelet. It also features Clint Peterson (Stereo) and Giovanni Reda (WESC), who are both teammates of Lee.

Lee later worked with Tony Hawk when he lent his voice and likeness to Tony Hawk's Project 8 to become a playable character. Lee then voiced Coach Frank, a character created during the development of Stereo, in Skate 3.

Professional skateboarder and owner of the Girl and Lakai Limited Footwear skateboard brands Mike Carroll has cited Lee as one of his skating influences.

Lee has been particularly cited for his 360 flips, which even the trick's inventor, Rodney Mullen, credits him with stylizing and popularizing.

Acting
After taking some minor acting roles in 1992–1994 (including the music video for the Sonic Youth single "100%", a small part in Mi Vida Loca, and a bit part as a dance instructor on Chance and Things), Lee left professional skateboarding for a full-time acting career. His first major movie role was in Kevin Smith's Mallrats, which became a cult hit. This started a friendship that subsequently led to appearances in many of Smith's films, including Chasing Amy, Dogma, Jay and Silent Bob Strike Back, Clerks II, Cop Out, and Jay and Silent Bob Reboot. Lee won an Independent Spirit Award for his role in Chasing Amy as Banky Edwards.

Lee graduated to leading man roles in Heartbreakers, Stealing Harvard, and A Guy Thing. He has had supporting roles in Vanilla Sky, Almost Famous, Dreamcatcher, Big Trouble, The Ballad of Jack and Rose, and Mumford, as well as a minor role in Enemy of the State. Lee also voiced Syndrome in The Incredibles and Jack-Jack Attack. He reprised the role as a "robot copy" of Syndrome in Disney Presents Pixar's The Incredibles in a Magic Kingdom Adventure. Lee is also the voice of Underdog in Underdog and portrays Dave Seville in the live action/CGI films starring Alvin and the Chipmunks.

In 2005, Lee was offered the lead role in My Name Is Earl. According to interviews on the first-season DVD, he passed on the series twice before finally agreeing to read for the pilot. In the series, he stars as Earl Hickey. Lee received two Golden Globe nominations for Best Performance by an Actor in a Television Series – Musical or Comedy in 2006 and 2007, as well as a nomination for the Screen Actors Guild Award for Outstanding Performance by a Male Actor in a Comedy Series in 2006.  NBC cancelled My Name is Earl after four seasons.

On June 22, 2010, Memphis Beat premiered. In the series, Lee starred with Alfre Woodard and portrayed Dwight Hendricks. In October 2011, it was announced the series was not renewed for a third season. He guest-starred in 2010 and 2013 episodes of Raising Hope, created by My Name is Earl creator and producer Greg Garcia.

As of December 2011, Lee appeared in Up All Night, but after its second season, it was officially cancelled on May 9, 2013. In June 2013, The Road Chip, a fourth installment of the Alvin and the Chipmunks franchise, was announced by 20th Century Fox; its release date was December 18, 2015.

Lee is in the Amazon Studios 49-minute pilot of Cocked, where he plays the character of Grady Paxson, one of three men who run a family company, manufacturing guns. The show premiered on January 15, 2015, and also stars Brian Dennehy, Diora Baird, Dreama Walker, and Sam Trammell. On January 25, 2015, The Hallmark Channel premiered Away & Back, a Hallmark Hall of Fame film starring Lee, Maggie Elizabeth Jones and Minka Kelly.

Photography
Lee began shooting photos regularly in the early 2000s, and became interested in instant photography. He released his first photo book through Refueled Magazine. It consists of "184 pages of Polaroid & Fuji Instant Film photographs from 2006-2016", printed in an edition of 500 copies. In 2018 he published, A Plain View, a photo book consisting of color 4×5 photographs from his exploration of rural and urban America. From June to December 2019, his photographs of Oklahoma were exhibited in exhibit OK: Jason Lee Photographs in Philbrook Museum of Art. These works are scheduled to be released as the book OK in 2022. In December 2020, British publishing house Stanley/Barker released In the Gold Dust Rush, consisting of black and white photographs of rural America. In 2021, Lee released Galveston, commissioned by the Galveston Historical Foundation. He is inspired by work of New Topographics movement, notably by Henry Wessell. He photographs on film.

Personal life
Lee married actress and photographer Carmen Llywelyn in 1995. They divorced in 2001. Llywelyn later cited Lee's commitment to Scientology as the principal cause for their separation. Llywelyn wrote that their relationship collapsed when she revealed to her talent manager and fellow Scientologist, Gay Ribisi (mother of actor Giovanni Ribisi), that she had read A Piece of Blue Sky, an anti-Scientology book. Two days after her conversation with Ribisi, Llywelyn received a one-paragraph "disconnection letter" from Lee and was labeled a Suppressive Person.

Following his divorce from Llywelyn, Lee became engaged to actress Beth Riesgraf. Together, they have a son, Pilot Inspektor. Lee states their son's name was inspired by "He's Simple, He's Dumb, He's the Pilot." by rock band Grandaddy.

Lee married Turkish model Ceren Alkaç in California in July 2008. A month later, Alkaç gave birth to a daughter named Casper. The couple had their second child, a son named Sonny, in 2012. Their third child, a daughter named Alberta 'Birdy' Lee, was born in 2017. 

In 2016, Lee revealed he is no longer a Scientologist. When asked by The Guardian why he became a Scientologist he said, "Everybody wants answers, Everybody wants to feel less depressed or less anxious or they want to try to understand some issue that they might have with themselves." He added: "Ultimately, it was just not for me. That’s it. I wasn’t really involved going back many, many years now."

Lee currently resides in Los Angeles, California with his family after living in Denton, Texas for four years. He is a 1/5th co-owner of the restaurant Barley and Board.

Filmography

Film

Television

Video games

References

External links

1970 births
20th-century American comedians
20th-century American male actors
21st-century American comedians
21st-century American male actors
American former Scientologists
American male film actors
American male television actors
American male video game actors
American male voice actors
American restaurateurs
American skateboarders
Comedians from California
Independent Spirit Award for Best Supporting Male winners
Living people
Male actors from Orange County, California
Male actors from Santa Ana, California
Sportspeople from Orange County, California
Television producers from California